Eric S. Nylund (born November 12, 1964) is an American novelist and professional technical writer. His wife, Syne Mitchell, is also a science fiction writer. He holds a B.Sc. in chemistry from the University of California, Santa Barbara and an M.Sc. in chemical physics from the University of California, San Diego. He lives in North Bend, Washington with his wife, Syne, and his son, Kai Nylund.

Nylund is the author of three novels set in the Halo universe: Halo: The Fall of Reach, Halo: First Strike, and Halo: Ghosts of Onyx, as well as a short story in Halo: Evolutions and the graphic novel Halo Wars: Genesis. He is employed as a writer for Microsoft Game Studios. His duties include the development of story bibles and other such fictional assets, the preparation of materials for marketing, and coordination with Microsoft localization, legal, and geopolitical departments.

In the 1990s he was hired by Microsoft to help rewrite and edit portions of Microsoft's multi-media encyclopedia. Since then, he has written several novels based on Microsoft-published games, including the aforementioned Halo novels, and Crimson Skies, which was written collaboratively with Eric S. Trautmann.

Nylund has written many original novels as well, including Signal to Noise, A Signal Shattered and Dry Water.

He has recently finished All That Lives Must Die, the sequel to Mortal Coils. Mortal Coils and All That Lives Must Die are books 1 and 2 in a proposed 5 book series. Publisher Tor Books has yet to officially purchase the next novel What Fools These Mortals, which is currently being written by Nylund. As of July 2013, no word has been publicly given on the status of the Mortal Coils series.

Bibliography

Novels 
 Pawn's Dream (1995)
 A Game of Universe (1997)
 Dry Water (1997)
 What Fools These Mortals
 Crimson Skies (2002)

Signal 
 Signal to Noise (1998)
 A Signal Shattered (1999)

Halo 
 Halo: The Fall of Reach (2001)
 Halo: First Strike (2003)
 Halo: Ghosts of Onyx (2006)
 Halo: Evolutions (2009)

Mortal Coils 
 Mortal Coils (2009)
 All That Lives Must Die (2010)

The Resisters 
 The Resisters (2011)
 Sterling Squadron (2012)
 Titan Base (2013)
 Operation Inferno (2013)

Hero of Thera Series 
 Hero of Thera (2017)
 A Thousand Drunken Monkeys (2019)

 Graphic novels Halo Wars: Genesis (2009)Battlestar Galactica: Cylon War'' (2009)

References

External links 

Author Information on eReader.com
Author Information on Internet Book List

Interview with Eric Nylund at AMCtv.com

1964 births
Living people
20th-century American novelists
21st-century American novelists
American male novelists
American science fiction writers
Technical writers
People from Panorama City, Los Angeles
20th-century American male writers
21st-century American male writers
People from North Bend, Washington